The New Zealand Great Walks are a set of popular tramping tracks developed and maintained by the Department of Conservation. They are New Zealand's premier tracks, through areas of some of the best scenery in the country, ranging from coastlines with beaches to dense rain forests and alpine terrain. The tracks are maintained to a high standard, making it easier for visitors to explore some of the most scenic parts of New Zealand's backcountry.

Only the Tongariro Northern Circuit and the Kepler Track are loop walks, all other Great Walks requiring transport to return to the starting point.

History
The Great Walks network was established by the Department of Conservation in 1992. The network was established both as a way to advertise hiking in New Zealand, but also as a means of managing and conserving the most popular tracks which were increasingly being damaged by unrestricted tourism.

Seven of the walks are covered by Google Street View from November 2015.

Facilities
The backcountry huts are conveniently located, comfortable, well-equipped, and high capacity. Both the huts and tracks on the Great Walks are of a higher standard than other tramping tracks in the country. These tracks are very popular with overseas visitors, partly due to their heavy promotion by the Department of Conservation and tourism operators. All of the Great Walks have booking systems to manage visitor pressure. Guided walks are available through private operators along many of the walks.

There is no charge required for walking access to the Great Walks, however, charges apply for overnight accommodation at the huts or campsites. It is not possible to access the Milford Track without having booked the track accommodation, as both ends of the track require boat transport to get there. Sections of the Abel Tasman Coastal Track are particularly popular for day walks without overnight accommodation, as even the middle sections are serviced by water taxis.

List of routes

North Island
 Lake Waikaremoana Great Walk
 Tongariro Northern Circuit – the second day of the circuit follows the Tongariro Alpine Crossing over volcanic terrain. 
 Whanganui Journey — this is actually not a walk but a kayak voyage on New Zealand's longest navigable river. It is however managed under the Great Walks system.

South Island
 Abel Tasman Coast Track – the most popular track.
 Heaphy Track – at 82 kilometres the longest of the walking tracks, delivering the biggest contrast from palm-fringed beaches to sub-alpine tussock grasslands.
 Routeburn Track – at 32 kilometres the shortest of the walking tracks.
 Milford Track – the most famous of the Great Walks.
 Paparoa Track and Pike29 Memorial Track – 55km track 
 Kepler Track

Stewart Island / Rakiura

 Rakiura Track

Future expansion

In 2018, the Department of Conservation investigated the addition of an eleventh Great Walk with the finalists being:

 Te Paki Coastal Track in Northland
 Queen Charlotte Track in the Marlborough Sounds
 Hump Ridge Track in coastal Southland

In July 2019, it was decided that the 61-km Hump Ridge Track will become the 11th Great Walk. There will be an upgrade to track and hut facilities, costing approx NZ$5m. The goal is to have this track join the Great Walks network in 2022.

See also
Tramping in New Zealand
New Zealand tramping tracks 
List of rail trails#New Zealand 
New Zealand Cycle Trail – originally conceived as single route, this is now to become a 'Great Rides' system analogous to the Great Walks.
Protected areas of New Zealand

References

External links

Department of Conservation Official site
New Zealand Tramper
Video compilation of Great Walks footage by the Department of Conservation. Released under CC-BY 3.0 licence
 Hiking New Zealand
 New Zealand Trails

 Great Walks